David J. Icove (born May 14, 1949) is a former Federal Bureau of Investigation Criminal Profiler and FBI Academy Instructor in the elite Behavioral Analysis Unit. He was one of the FBI's first criminal profilers to specialize in the apprehension of serial arsonists and bombers. He is Fellow in the National Academy of Forensic Engineers and co-author along with Gerald A. Haynes of Kirk's Fire Investigation, the leading textbook in the field of fire investigation.

Early life and education 
David Icove was born May 14, 1949 in Akron, Ohio and raised in Shaker Heights, Ohio. He graduated in 1967 from Shaker Heights High School and went to college at the University of Tennessee and the University of Maryland.

Career
A leading authority in forensic engineering examinations of fires and explosions, he is co-author of Kirk's Fire Investigation, Combating Arson-for-Profit, and Forensic Fire Scene Reconstruction, three of the leading expert treatises in the field. Paul Leland Kirk (1902–1970), the author of the original text Fire Investigation that was the basis for Kirk's Fire Investigation.

Hired in 1984 by the Federal Bureau of Investigation, National Center for the Analysis of Violent Crime, he developed for the FBI the first modern-day motive classification system for arson. He also developed at the FBI an Artificial Intelligence research project known as PROFILER PDF, a rule-based expert system programmed to detect and link serial violent crimes using data parsed from real-time news stories, the Violent Criminal Apprehension Program, and other FBI databases. 

Representing the FBI, he testified three times before key U.S. Congressional Committees seeking guidance on key legislative initiatives. 

In 1993, he transferred to the U.S. Tennessee Valley Authority Police to eventually become the Assistant Chief of Police for Criminal Investigations. After the September 11 attacks, he represented TVA full-time as a Task Force Agent on the FBI's Joint Terrorism Task Force, until his retirement in 2005.  

In May 2015, he joined a Board of Directors to form the Murder Accountability Project (MAP), a nonprofit organization that detects and disseminates information about homicides, especially unsolved killings and serial murders committed in the United States. MAP's Board consists of a group of retired detectives, investigative journalists, homicide scholars, and a forensic psychiatrist, who strive to use Artificial Intelligence to identify and link clusters of homicides based upon a combination of victim/offender relationships, manner of death, and geographic location.
  
As of 2019, David Icove is the UL (safety organization) Professor of Practice at The University of Tennessee in the Department of Electrical Engineering and Computer Science, where he directs their Fire Protection Engineering Graduate Program.

Professional associations
 Registered Professional Engineer
 Board Certified Diplomate and Fellow, National Academy of Forensic Engineers 
 Fellow, Society of Fire Protection Engineers
 Senior and Life Member, Institute of Electrical and Electronics Engineers
 Member, National Society of Professional Engineers
 Member, National Fire Protection Association
 Member and Certified Fire Investigator, International Association of Arson Investigators

Awards
 Shaker Heights High School Alumni Hall of Fame, Class of 1967
 Charles Edward Ferris Award – University of Tennessee
 National Arson Prevention Award – Insurance Committee for Arson Control

Personal
Dr. Icove currently resides in Knoxville, Tennessee, with his wife Sharon.

See also
Crime Classification Manual
FBI Method of Profiling
fire investigation
Kirk's Fire Investigation
Offender profiling

References

External links
Personal Home Page
UTK Home page

1949 births
Living people
University of Maryland, College Park alumni
University of Tennessee alumni
Federal Bureau of Investigation agents
People from Shaker Heights, Ohio